Melville  Air Station (ADC ID: N-24) was a General Surveillance Radar station. It was closed in 1988.

History
The site was established in 1953 as a General Surveillance Radar station, funded by the United States Air Force. It was used initially by the Northeast Air Command, which stationed the 641st Aircraft Control and Warning Squadron on the station on 1 November 1957.  The station functioned as a Ground-Control Intercept (GCI) and warning station.  As a GCI station, the squadron's role was to guide interceptor aircraft toward unidentified intruders picked up on the unit's radar scopes.

It was equipped with the following radars:
 Search Radar: AN/FPS-3C, AN/FPS-502, AN/FPS-20A, AN/FPS-87A, AN/FPS-93A, AN/CPS-6B
 Height Radar: AN/TPS-502, AN/FPS-6B, AN/FPS-90

The station was reassigned to the USAF Air Defense Command on 1 April 1957, and was given designation "N-24".

In 1971, the USAF transferred control of the site to the Canadian Forces.  It was closed in 1988.

USAF units and assignments 
Units:
 641st Aircraft Control and Warning Squadron, Activated at Grenier Air Force Base, New Hampshire 26 May 1953
 Moved to Melville Air Station, 1 November 1957
 Discontinued 30 June 1971

Assignments
 64th Air Division, 1 August 1953
 4732d Air Defense Group, 1 April 1957
 Goose Air Defense Sector, 1 April 1960
 37th Air Division, 1 April 1966
 21st Air Division, 31 March 1970 – 30 June 1971

References

  A Handbook of Aerospace Defense Organization 1946 - 1980,  by Lloyd H. Cornett and Mildred W. Johnson, Office of History, Aerospace Defense Center, Peterson Air Force Base, Colorado
 Winkler, David F. (1997), Searching the skies: the legacy of the United States Cold War defense radar program. Prepared for United States Air Force Headquarters Air Combat Command.

Radar stations of the United States Air Force
Aerospace Defense Command military installations
Military installations in Newfoundland and Labrador
Installations of the United States Air Force in Canada
1953 establishments in Newfoundland and Labrador
Military installations established in 1953
Military installations closed in 1988
1988 disestablishments in Newfoundland and Labrador